Defense Distributed is an online open-source hardware organization that develops digital schematics of firearms in CAD files, or "wiki weapons", that may be downloaded from the Internet and used in 3D printing or CNC milling applications. Among the organization's goals is to develop and freely publish firearms-related design schematics that can be downloaded and reproduced by anyone with a 3D printer or milling machine, facilitating the popular production of ghost guns.

The company is best known for developing and releasing the files for the Liberator, the world's first completely 3D printed gun. On May 5, 2013, Defense Distributed made these printable STL files public, and within days the United States Department of State demanded they be removed from the Internet, citing a violation of the International Traffic in Arms Regulations.

On May 6, 2015, Defense Distributed, joined by the Second Amendment Foundation (SAF), filed Defense Distributed v. U.S. Dept. of State in the Western District of Texas, leading the State Department to eventually offer a settlement in 2018. On July 27, 2018, Defense Distributed released ten CAD files for download at DEFCAD before a federal judge in Washington State enjoined the settlement in Defense Distributed I.  On April 27, 2021, the United States Court of Appeals for the Ninth Circuit vacated the injunction, and ordered the district court to dismiss the suit challenging the settlement.   Shortly thereafter, Defense Distributed released its library of files to the public. Multiple federal and state lawsuits are pending which challenge, or attempt to uphold, this settlement.

History

Founding
After raising  via a suspended crowd-funding appeal, suffering the confiscation of its first 3D printer, and partnering with private manufacturing firms, the organization began live fire testing of the first generation of printable firearms in December 2012.

In its first year of operation the organization produced a durable printed receiver for the AR-15, the first printed standard capacity AR-15 magazine, and the first printed magazine for the AK-47.  These 3D printable files were available for download at the organization's publishing site DEFCAD, but are now largely hosted on file sharing websites.

The organization has been predominantly represented in public since July 2012 by Cody Wilson, who is described as a founder and spokesperson. In September 2018, Wilson briefly resigned from the company while under indictment for sexual assault, returning to his role in late 2019.

Purpose
According to the Defense Distributed website, the nonprofit was founded as "the first private defense contractor in service of the general public," in order to "[advance] the state of the art in small scale, digital, personal gunsmithing." In court records the organization claims "to publish and distribute... such information and knowledge in promotion of the public interest".

The organization's motivations have been described as "less about [a] gun... than about democratizing manufacturing technology,"
In an interview with Slashdot, Cody Wilson described the Wiki Weapon project as a chance to  "experiment with Enlightenment ideas… to literally materialize freedom.”

At Bitcoin 2012 in London, Wilson explained the organization as interested in inspiring libertarian forms of social organization and technologically driven inversions of authority.

DEFCAD

In December 2012, as a response to  Makerbot Industries' decision to remove firearms-related 3D printable files at the popular repository Thingiverse, Defense Distributed launched a companion site at defcad.org to publicly host the removed 3D printable files and its own.
Public and community submissions to DEFCAD rose quickly, and in March 2013, at the SXSW Interactive festival, Wilson announced a repurposed and expanded DEFCAD as a separate entity that would serve as a 3D search engine and development hub, while maintaining the spirit of access endemic to Defense Distributed. DEFCAD has been called "The Pirate Bay of 3D Printing" and "the anti-Makerbot."

Ghost Gunner

In October 2014, Defense Distributed began selling to the public a miniature CNC mill for completing receivers for the AR-15 semi-automatic rifle. For a review of the machine in Wired, Andy Greenberg manufactured a series of lowers and called the machine "absurdly easy to use."
Since 2016 the Ghost Gunner has been recognized as the most popular machine tool for the production of ghost guns.

Administration

Legal history
Defense Distributed was seeking 501(c)(3) federal tax exemption but they abandoned their application after being denied by the IRS.

The organization operates to publish intellectual property and information developed by licensed firearms manufacturers and the public.

Cody Wilson has a Type 7 Federal Firearms License (FFL).

Legal challenges

Stratasys confiscation
Learning of Defense Distributed's plans in 2012, manufacturer Stratasys, Ltd threatened legal action and demanded the return of the 3D printer it had leased to Wilson. On September 26, before the printer was assembled for use, Wilson received an email from Stratasys suggesting that he might use the printer "for illegal purposes".
Stratasys immediately canceled its lease with Wilson and sent a team to confiscate the printer the next day. Wilson was subsequently questioned by the ATF when visiting an ATF field office in Austin, Texas to inquire about legalities and regulations relating to the Wiki Weapons project.

The Undetectable Firearms Act
Defense Distributed's efforts have prompted renewed discussion and examination of the Undetectable Firearms Act. The Liberator pistol was cited in White House and Congressional calls to renew the Act in 2013.

International Traffic in Arms Regulations

On May 9, 2013, The United States Department of State Directorate of Defense Trade Controls (DDTC) directed Defense Distributed to remove the download links to its publicly accessible CAD files. The State Department's letter, likely prompted by the Liberator Pistol, referenced § 127.1 of the International Traffic in Arms Regulations (ITAR), interpreting the regulations to impose a prior approval requirement on publication of Defense Distributed's files into the public domain, a legal position noted at the time to suffer from First and Second Amendment infirmities.

Defense Distributed v. U.S. Dept. of State

On May 6, 2015, Defense Distributed filed a Constitutional challenge against the State Department in the Western District of Texas, suing agents of the DDTC and accusing the federal government of knowingly violating the company's First, Second, and Fifth amendment liberties. Defense Distributed was joined in its suit by the Second Amendment Foundation.

After three years of procedural wrangling, on July 10, 2018, Wired magazine reported Defense Distributed and SAF had accepted a settlement offer from the Department of State. Cody Wilson explained his intention to immediately relaunch DEFCAD and begin the work of digitizing popular firearms for public consumption.

State of Washington et al v. United States Department of State et al
A coalition of state attorneys general sued to enjoin the settlement in Defense Distributed v. U.S. Dept. of State, citing "irreparable harm if the [firearm CAD files] are published on the internet." Defense Distributed joined the suit as a necessary party, claiming the states lacked Article III standing and protections under the First Amendment. A temporary restraining order was issued by U.S. District Judge Robert Lasnik on July 31, 2018. Lasnick granted a permanent injunction on November 12, 2019, ruling the State Department failed to give an adequate explanation of its settlement with Defense Distributed as required by the Administrative Procedure Act, a decision which was criticized since ITAR designations are by statute unable to be judicially reviewed.

Defense Distributed appealed the injunction to the Ninth Circuit Court of Appeals, which rejected the case in July 2020, ruling the organization lacked the standing to appeal a decision directed at the State Department. On April 27, 2021, however, the Ninth Circuit vacated an injunction in a related case, holding that Congress had expressly prohibited judicial review of the agency decisions in question. Defense Distributed again released its full library of files to the public domain.

Defense Distributed v. Gurbir Grewal
In July 2018, at the same time as State of Washington v. Department of State, Defense Distributed filed a civil lawsuit under section 1983 of the Civil Rights Act against New Jersey Attorney General Gurbir Grewal, who sent a cease and desist letter directing the firm to not publish the files subject to their settlement with the U.S. Department of State. Defense Distributed argued New Jersey law had no power over their settlement and its use to impede their file publication was unconstitutional.

The suit was originally dismissed in district court over a question of personal jurisdiction, but in August 2020 the Fifth Circuit Court of Appeals reversed the lower court and allowed the lawsuit to proceed in Texas.
On March 29, 2021, the Supreme Court denied Grewal's petition for a writ of certiorari, affirming the Fifth Circuit's decision, and remanding the case to the district court.

Reception

Despite the years of legal challenges, Defense Distributed's and other firearms CAD files have always been on the internet. The files remain available on sympathetic mirror sites, Twitter, Reddit, and GitHub, and have been downloaded millions of times through peer-to-peer torrent and other services.

The company has been endorsed by the Gun Owners of America (GOA). However, the National Rifle Association (NRA) has offered no official comment on the organization or its activities.

Open-source software advocate Eric S. Raymond has endorsed the organization and its efforts, calling Defense Distributed "friends of freedom" and writing "I approve of any development that makes it more difficult for governments and criminals to monopolize the use of force. As 3D printers become less expensive and more ubiquitous, this could be a major step in the right direction."

Aaron Timms of Blouin News has written Defense Distributed has performed “the greatest piece of political performance art of [the 21st] century.”

For its activities, Defense Distributed has been accused of endangering public safety and attempting to frustrate and alter the US system of government. However, critics have also noted that Defense Distributed has merely offered the means of production back to the masses in a way not too dissimilar from the effect the printing press had on the spread of information and the decentralization of power in societies.

See also 
3D printed firearms
Right to keep and bear arms
Gun control
Gun politics in the United States
List of notable 3D printed weapons and parts
Deterrence Dispensed

References

External links

 DEFCAD
 The Wiki Weapon development blog

3D printing
Non-profit organizations based in the United States
Weapon development
Non-profit technology
Online organizations
Free and open-source software organizations
Gun politics
Firearm manufacturers of the United States